Holoprosencephaly-ectrodactyly-cleft lip/palate syndrome, also simply known as Hartsfield syndrome, is a rare genetic disorder characterized by the presence of variable holoprosencephaly, ectrodactyly, cleft lip and palate, alongside generalized ectodermal abnormalities. Additional findings include endocrine anomalies and developmental delays.

Signs and symptoms 

Individuals with this condition exhibit the following symptoms: 

Agenesis or hypoplasia of the corpus callosum
Encephalocele
Holoprosencephaly
Craniosynostosis
Low-set ears
Microphthalmia
Hypertelorism
Telecanthus
Ptosis of the eyelid
Down-slanting palpebral fissures
Depression of the nasal bridge
Cleft palate
Cleft lip
Respiratory problems
Radial dysplasia
Cleft hand deformity
Syndactyly
Fetal growth delay

Complications 

Most babies with this condition  don't usually live to suffer the complications of the condition, since they usually are stillborn or die in early infancy (premature death).

Genetics 

This condition is caused by missense mutations in the FGFR1 gene, located in chromosome 8. These mutations can either be inherited in an autosomal dominant or an X-linked manner. This gene is essential for the creation of the fibroblast growth factor receptor 1 protein, which involve processes like cell division, regulating cell growth and maturation, blood vessel formation, healing of wounds and appropriate embryonic development. The mutations involved in this disorder either decrease or completely eliminate the proper functioning of the FGFR1 protein, this impairment takes the ability of the protein to bind to FGFs with it, this causes the receptor to be unable of transmitting signals properly.

Types 

There are some types (not clinically recognized) of this condition based on their mode of inheritance, some of them include autosomal recessive, autosomal dominant, and X-linked.

Diagnosis 

This condition can be diagnosed through the following:

Whole exome sequencing
Whole genome sequencing
General physical examination
Post-mortem examination/autopsy

Prevalence 

According to OrphaNet, 35 cases worldwide have been described in medical literature.

History 

This condition was first discovered in 1984 by Hartsfield et al. when they described a male baby with various congenital anomalies, of which three were holoprosencephaly, ectrodactyly, and cleft lip and palate. Other findings included depressed nasal bridge, hypertelorism, low-set ears, craniosynostosis, right radius deficiency, hypoplasia of the corpus callosum, agenesis of the septum pellucidum, frontal lobe fusion, and marked agenesis of the olfactory bulb and tract. Said baby had died when he was 7 days old.

See also 

Holoprosencephaly
Ectrodactyly
Cleft lip and palate
Stillbirth
Miscarriage

References 

Rare genetic syndromes
Genetic diseases and disorders